The Christian Democratic Action for Social Justice (CDA) was a political party in Namibia.

It was founded in 1982 through a split in the Democratic Turnhalle Alliance. The party's president was Peter Kalangula, previously the president of Namibian National Democratic Party (NNDP) and the Ovambo leader in the DTA. The party's membership was mainly Ovambo, formed by former supporters of the NNDP, and managed to get control over the Ovambo Legislative Assembly which was the administration of the self-governed bantustan of Ovamboland. The CDA existed until 1989 when it merged with the United Democratic Front.

See also

List of political parties in Namibia

References

Christian democratic parties in Africa
Defunct political parties in Namibia
Political parties established in 1982
1982 establishments in South West Africa
Political parties disestablished in 1989
1989 disestablishments in South West Africa